The Unicorn and Other Poems is a 1956 poetry collection by the American writer Anne Morrow Lindbergh. The poems span from the period 1935–1955.

Contents

Reception
The book sold well but was overall poorly received by critics, which made Lindbergh feel ashamed of her poems. Kirkus Reviews described the book as "the poetic versions of almost the same themes as Gift from the Sea", and wrote that these themes "are caught up here in a new freshness which will have its appeal to women who experience many of these emotions in common". The critic wrote that the quality is high enough "to win Anne Lindbergh a place among outstanding women poets".

References

1956 books
American poetry collections
Books by Anne Morrow Lindbergh